The Battles of Khalkhin Gol were the decisive engagements of the undeclared Soviet–Japanese border conflicts involving the Soviet Union, Mongolia, Japan and Manchukuo in 1939. The conflict was named after the river Khalkhin Gol, which passes through the battlefield. In Japan, the decisive battle of the conflict is known as the  after Nomonhan, a nearby village on the border between Mongolia and Manchuria. The battles resulted in the defeat of the Japanese Sixth Army.

Background

After the Japanese occupation of Manchuria in 1931, Japan turned its military interests to Soviet territories that bordered those areas. The first major Soviet-Japanese border incident, the Battle of Lake Khasan, occurred in 1938 in Primorye. Clashes between Japanese and Soviet forces occurred frequently along the border of Manchuria.

In 1939, Manchuria was a puppet state of Japan known as Manchukuo, and Mongolia was a communist state allied with the Soviet Union, known as the Mongolian People's Republic. The Japanese maintained that the border between Manchukuo and Mongolia was the Khalkhin Gol (English "Khalkha River") which flows into Lake Buir.

The principal occupying army of Manchukuo was the Kwantung Army of Japan, consisting of some of the best Japanese units in 1939. However, the western region of Manchukuo was garrisoned by the relatively newly formed 23rd Infantry Division at Hailar under General Michitarō Komatsubara and included several Manchu army and border guard units all under the direct command of the Sixth Army. The 23rd was the newest and least experienced division in the entire Kwantung Army. In addition to this, the 23rd Division was equipped with outdated equipment. Japanese army experts rated the combat capability of the 23rd Division as "below medium", comparable to a garrison division on occupation duty in China.

The Soviet forces consisted of the 57th Special Corps, deployed from the Transbaikal Military District. They were responsible for defending the border between Siberia and Manchuria. The Mongolian troops mainly consisted of cavalry brigades and light artillery units, and proved to be effective and agile, but lacked armor and manpower in sufficient numbers.

On 2 June 1939 Georgy Zhukov was told by Commissar of Defence Kliment Voroshilov that Stalin was dissatisfied with the local commander and he was to go to Mongolia, take command of the 57th Special Corps and eliminate Japanese provocations by inflicting a decisive reverse on the Imperial Japanese Army (when summoned to Moscow on 1 June he had feared he was to be arrested and interrogated by the NKVD).

In 1939, the Japanese Cabinet sent instructions to the Kwantung Army to strengthen and fortify Manchukuo's borders with Mongolia and the Soviet Union. Additionally, the Kwantung Army, which had long been stationed in Manchuria far from the Japanese Home Islands, had become largely autonomous and tended to act without approval from, or even against the direction of, the Japanese government.

Battles

May: Skirmishes

The incident began on 11 May 1939. A Mongolian cavalry unit of some 70 to 90 men had entered the disputed area in search of grazing for their horses. On that day, Manchu cavalry attacked the Mongolians and drove them back across the river Khalkhin Gol. On 13 May, the Mongolian force returned in greater numbers and the Manchukoans failed to dislodge them.

On 14 May, Lt. Col. Yaozo Azuma led the reconnaissance regiment of the 23rd Infantry Division, supported by the 64th Infantry Regiment of the same division, under Colonel Takemitsu Yamagata, into the territory and the Mongolians withdrew. Soviet and Mongolian troops returned to the disputed region, however, and Azuma's force again moved to evict them, but the Soviet-Mongolian forces surrounded Azuma's force on 28 May and destroyed it. The Azuma force suffered eight officers and 97 men killed and one officer and 33 men wounded, for 63% total casualties.

The commander of the Soviet forces and of the Far East Front was Komandarm Grigori Shtern from May 1938.

June: Escalation
Both sides increased their forces in the area. Soon Japan had 30,000 men in the theater. The Soviets dispatched a new corps commander, Comcor Georgy Zhukov, who arrived on 5 June and brought more motorized and armored forces (I Army Group) to the combat zone. Accompanying Zhukov was Comcor Yakov Smushkevich with his aviation unit. J. Lkhagvasuren, Corps Commissar of the Mongolian People's Revolutionary Army, was appointed Zhukov's deputy.

On 27 June the Japanese Army Air Force's 2nd Air Brigade struck the Soviet airbase at Tamsak-Bulak in Mongolia. The Japanese won this engagement, but the strike had been ordered by the Kwantung Army without obtaining permission from Imperial Japanese Army (IJA) headquarters in Tokyo. In an effort to prevent the incident from escalating, Tokyo promptly ordered the JAAF not to conduct any more air-strikes against Soviet airbases.

Throughout June there were reports of Soviet and Mongolian activity on both sides of the river near Nomonhan and small-scale attacks on isolated Manchukoan units. At the end of the month, the commander of the 23rd Japanese Infantry Division, Lt. Gen. Michitarō Komatsubara, received permission to "expel the invaders".

July: Japanese assault
The Japanese planned a two-pronged assault. The first attack would be made by three regiments plus part of a fourth: the 71st and the 72nd Infantry Regiment (23rd Division), a battalion of the 64th Infantry Regiment and the 26th Infantry Regiment under Colonel Shinichiro Sumi (7th Infantry Division). This force would advance across the Khalkin Gol, destroy Soviet forces on Baintsagan Hill on the west bank, then make a left turn and advance south to the Kawatama Bridge. The second prong of the attack would be the task of the IJA 1st Tank Corps (1st TC) (Yasuoka Detachment), consisting of the 3rd and 4th Tank Regiments, plus a part of the 64th Infantry Regiment, a battalion from the 28th Infantry Regiment, detached from the 7th Infantry, 24th Engineer Regiment, and a battalion from the 13th Field-Artillery Regiment, all under the overall command of Lieutenant General Yasuoka Masaomi. This force would attack Soviet troops on the east bank of the Khalkhin Gol and north of the Holsten River. The two Japanese thrusts were to join on the wings.
 Lt. Gen. Yasuoka Masaomi, IJA, Commanding Officer, 1st Tank Corps
 3rd Tank Regiment
 Type 89 I-Go medium tanks – 26
 Type 97 Chi-Ha medium tanks – 4
 Type 94 tankettes – 7
 Type 97 Te-Ke tankettes – 4
 4th Tank Regiment
 Type 95 Ha-Go light tanks – 35
 Type 89 I-Go medium tanks – 8
 Type 94 tankettes – 3

The northern task force succeeded in crossing the Khalkhin Gol, driving the Soviets from Baintsagan Hill, and advancing south along the west bank. However, Zhukov, perceiving the threat, launched a counterattack with 450 tanks and armored cars. The tanks consisted of primarily BTs with a handful of T-26s, while the armored cars were BA-10s and BA-3/6s, which were similar in armor and armament (main:  gun 20K mod, secondary: two  machine guns) to the Soviet light tanks. The Soviet armored force, despite being unsupported by infantry, attacked the Japanese on three sides and nearly encircled them. The Japanese force, further handicapped by having only one pontoon bridge across the river for supplies, was forced to withdraw, recrossing the river on 5 July. Meanwhile, the 1st Tank Corps of the Yasuoka Detachment (the southern task force) attacked on the night of 2 July, moving in the darkness to avoid the Soviet artillery on the high ground of the river's west bank. A pitched battle ensued in which the Yasuoka Detachment lost over half its armor, but still could not break through the Soviet forces on the east bank and reach the Kawatama Bridge. After a Soviet counterattack on 9 July threw the battered, depleted Yasuoka Detachment back, it was dissolved and Yasuoka was relieved.

The two armies continued to spar with each other over the next two weeks along a  front running along the east bank of the Khalkhin Gol to its junction with the Holsten River. On 23 July, the Japanese launched another large-scale assault, sending the 64th and 72nd Infantry Regiments against Soviet forces defending the Kawatama Bridge. Japanese artillery supported the attack with a massive barrage that consumed more than half of their ammunition stores over a period of two days. The attack made some progress but failed to break through Soviet lines and reach the bridge. The Japanese disengaged from the attack on 25 July due to mounting casualties and depleted artillery stores. By this point they had suffered over 5,000 casualties between late May and 25 July, with Soviet losses being much higher but more easily replaced. The battle drifted into a stalemate.

August: Soviet counterattack

With war apparently imminent in Europe, and to avoid fighting a two front war, Zhukov planned a major offensive on 20 August 1939 to clear the Japanese from the Khalkhin Gol region and to end the fighting. Zhukov, using a fleet of at least 4,000 trucks (IJA officers with hindsight disputed this, saying he instead used 10,000 to 20,000 motor vehicles) transporting supplies from the nearest base in Chita ( away) assembled a powerful armored force of three tank brigades (the 4th, 6th and 11th), and two mechanized brigades (the 7th and 8th, which were armored car units with attached infantry support). This force was allocated to the Soviet left and right wings. The entire Soviet force consisted of three rifle divisions, two tank divisions and two more tank brigades (in all, some 498 BT-5 and BT-7 tanks), two motorized infantry divisions, and over 550 fighters and bombers. The Mongolians committed two cavalry divisions.

In comparison, at the point of contact, the Kwantung Army had only the 23rd Infantry Division, which with various attached forces was equivalent to two light infantry divisions. Japanese intelligence, despite demonstrating an ability to track the build-up of Zhukov's force, failed to precipitate an appropriate response from below. Thus, when the Soviets finally did launch their offensive, Komatsubara was caught off-guard. To test the Japanese defences prior to their main assault on 20 August, the Soviets launched three aggressive probing assaults, one on 3 August and the others on 7/8 August. All three were disastrously thrown back, with around 1,000 combined dead and several tanks knocked out on the Soviet side compared to just 85 Japanese casualties. The Japanese counterattacked and routed elements of the Mongolian 8th Cavalry Division, seizing a hilly sector of the battlefront. Despite the fact that no more major fighting would take place until 20 August, Japanese casualties continued to mount at a rate of 40 wounded per day. Kwantung Army staff officers were becoming increasingly worried over the disorganized state of the 6th Army headquarters and supply elements. The growing casualty count meant that the green 23rd Division would have to take, train and assimilate new replacements "on the job". By contrast, Tokyo's oft-stated desire that it would not escalate the fighting at Khalkhin Gol proved immensely relieving to the Soviets, freed to hand-pick select units from across the military to be concentrated for a local offensive without fear of Japanese retaliation elsewhere.

Zhukov decided it was time to break the stalemate. At 05:45 on 20 August 1939, Soviet artillery and 557 aircraft attacked Japanese positions, the first fighter-bomber offensive in Soviet Air Force history. Approximately 50,000 Soviet and Mongolian soldiers of the 57th Special Corps attacked the east bank of the Khalkhin Gol. Three infantry divisions and a tank brigade crossed the river, supported by massed artillery and by the Soviet Air Force. Once the Japanese were pinned down by the attack of Soviet center units, Soviet armored units swept around the flanks and attacked the Japanese in the rear, achieving a classic double envelopment. When the Soviet wings linked up at Nomonhan village on 25 August, they trapped the Japanese 23rd Infantry Division. On 26 August, a Japanese counterattack to relieve the 23rd Division failed. On 27 August the 23rd Division attempted to break out of the encirclement but failed. When the surrounded forces refused to surrender, they were again hit with artillery and air attacks. By 31 August, Japanese forces on the Mongolian side of the border were destroyed, leaving remnants of the 23rd Division on the Manchurian side. The Soviets had achieved their objective.

The Soviet Union and Japan agreed to a cease-fire on 15 September; it took effect the following day at 1:10 pm.

Aftermath

Japanese records report 8,440 killed, 8,766 wounded, 162 aircraft lost in combat, and 42 tanks lost (of which 29 were later repaired and redeployed). Roughly 500 to 600 Japanese and Manchus were taken prisoner during the battles. Due to a military doctrine that prohibited surrender, the Japanese listed most of these men as killed in action, for the benefit of their families. Some sources put the Japanese casualties at 45,000 or more killed, with Soviet casualties of at least 17,000. However, these estimates for Japanese casualties are considered inaccurate as they exceed the total strength of the Japanese forces involved in the battle (estimated at 28,000–40,000 troops, despite Soviet claims that they were facing 75,000). According to the records of the Bureau 6A hospital, the Japanese casualties amounted to 7,696 killed, 8,647 wounded, 1,021 missing, and 2,350 sick, for a total of 19,714 personnel losses, including 2,895 Manchu casualties. The Kwantung Army headquarters and their records give a slightly different figure of 8,629 killed and 9,087 injured. The former Japanese Minister of Agriculture and Forestry estimated a total of 35,000 to 36,000 casualties The Soviets initially claimed to have inflicted 29,085 casualties on the Japanese, but later increased this to 61,000 for the official histories.

In recent years, with the opening of the Soviet archives, a more accurate assessment of Soviet casualties has emerged from the work of Grigoriy Krivosheev, citing 7,974 killed and 15,251 wounded. In the newer, 2001 edition, the Soviet losses are given as 9,703 killed and missing (6,472 killed and died of wounds during evacuation, 1,152 died of wounds in hospitals, eight died of disease, 2,028 missing, 43 non-combat dead), 15,251 wounded, and a further 701 to 2,225 sick, totaling between 25,655 and 27,179 casualties. In addition to their personnel losses, the Soviets lost a large amount of materiel including 253 tanks, 250 aircraft (including 208 in combat), 96 artillery pieces, and 133 armored cars. Of the Soviet tank losses, 75–80% were destroyed by anti-tank guns, 15–20% by field artillery, 5–10% by infantry-thrown incendiary bombs, 2–3% by aircraft, and 2–3% by hand grenades and mines. The large number of Soviet armor casualties are reflected in the manpower losses for Soviet tank crews. A total of 1,559 Soviet "Tank Troops" were killed or wounded during the battles.

Mongolian casualties were 556–990, with at least 11 armored cars destroyed and 1,921 horses and camels lost.

Nomonhan was the first use of airpower on a massive scale in a high-intensity battle to obtain a specific military objective. The combatants remained at peace until August 1945, when the Soviet Union declared war on Japan and invaded Manchukuo and other territory after the atomic bombing of Hiroshima.

Air combat

Soviet aircraft losses

Japanese aircraft losses

Aircraft losses summary and notes
Combat losses include aircraft shot down during aerial combat, written off due to combat damage or destroyed on the ground.

Non-combat losses include aircraft that were lost due to accidents, as well as write-offs of warplanes due to the end of their service life. Thus Soviet combat losses amount to 163 fighters, 44 bombers, and a reconnaissance aircraft, with further 385 fighters and 51 bombers requiring repairs due to combat damage. VVS (Soviet Air Forces) personnel losses were 88 killed in aerial combat, 11 killed by anti-aircraft artillery, 65 missing, six killed in air-strikes and four died of wounds (174 total) and 113 wounded. The Japanese combat losses were 97 fighters, 25 bombers and 41 other (mostly reconnaissance), while 128 fighters, 54 bombers and 38 other required repairs due to combat damage. The Japanese Air Force suffered 152 dead and 66 severely wounded.

Aircraft ordnance expenditures
USSR:
Bomber sorties 2,015, fighter sorties 18,509; 7.62 mm machine gun rounds fired 1,065,323;  cannon rounds expended 57,979; bombs dropped 78,360 (1,200 tons).

Japan:
Fighter/bomber sorties 10,000 (estimated);  machine gun rounds fired 1.6 million; bombs dropped 970 tons.

Summary

While this engagement is little known in the West, it played an important part in subsequent Japanese conduct in World War II. The battle earned the Kwantung Army the displeasure of officials in Tokyo, not so much due to its defeat, but because it was initiated and escalated without direct authorization from the Japanese government. This defeat combined with the Chinese resistance in the Second Sino-Japanese War, together with the signing of the Nazi-Soviet non-aggression pact (which deprived the Army of the basis of its war policy against the USSR), moved the Imperial General Staff in Tokyo away from the policy of the North Strike Group favored by the Army, which wanted to seize Siberia for its resources as far as Lake Baikal.

Instead, support shifted to the South Strike Group, favored by the Navy, which wanted to seize the resources of Southeast Asia, especially the petroleum and mineral-rich Dutch East Indies. Masanobu Tsuji, the Japanese colonel who had helped instigate the Nomonhan incident, was one of the strongest proponents of the attack on Pearl Harbor. General Ryūkichi Tanaka, Chief of the Army Ministry's Military Service Bureau in 1941, testified after the war that "the most determined single protagonist in favor of war with the United States was Tsuji Masanobu". Tsuji later wrote that his experience of Soviet fire-power at Nomonhan convinced him not to attack the Soviet Union in 1941. On 24 June 1941, two days after the war on the Eastern Front broke out, the Japanese army and navy leaders adopted a resolution "not intervening in German Soviet war for the time being". In August 1941, Japan and the Soviet Union reaffirmed their neutrality pact.
The United States and Britain had imposed an oil embargo on Japan, threatening to stop the Japanese war effort, but the European colonial powers were weakening and suffering early defeats in the war with Germany; only the US Pacific Fleet stood in the way of seizing the oil-rich Dutch East Indies. Because of this, Japan's focus was ultimately directed to the south, leading to its decision to launch the attack on Pearl Harbor on 7 December of that year. Despite plans being carried out for a potential war against the USSR (particularly contingent on German advances towards Moscow), the Japanese would never launch an offensive against the Soviet Union. In 1941, the two countries signed agreements respecting the borders of Mongolia and Manchukuo and pledging neutrality towards each other. In the closing months of World War II, the Soviet Union would annul the Neutrality Pact and invade the Japanese territories in Manchuria, northern Korea, and the southern part of Sakhalin island.

Soviet assessment
The battle was the first victory for the soon-to-be-famous Soviet general Georgy Zhukov, earning him the first of his four Hero of the Soviet Union awards. The two other generals, Grigori Shtern and Yakov Smushkevich, had important roles and were also awarded the Hero of the Soviet Union. They would, however, both be executed in the 1941 Purges. Zhukov himself was promoted and transferred west to the Kiev district. The battle experience gained by Zhukov was put to good use in December 1941 at the Battle of Moscow. Zhukov was able to use this experience to launch the first successful Soviet counteroffensive against the German invasion of 1941. Many units of the Siberian and other trans-Ural armies were part of this attack, and the decision to move these divisions from Siberia was aided by the Soviet spy Richard Sorge in Tokyo, who alerted the Soviet government that the Japanese were looking south and were unlikely to launch another attack against Siberia in the immediate future. A year after defending Moscow against the advancing Germans, Zhukov planned and executed the Red Army's offensive at the Battle of Stalingrad, using a technique very similar to Khalkhin Gol, in which the Soviet forces held the enemy fixed in the center, built up an undetected mass force in the immediate rear area, and launched a pincer attack on the wings to trap the German army.

Following the battle, the Soviets generally found the results unsatisfactory, despite their victory. Though the Soviet forces in the Far East in 1939 were not plagued by fundamental issues to the same extent as those in Europe during the 1941 campaigns, their generals were still unimpressed by their army's performance. As noted by Pyotr Grigorenko, the Red Army went in with a very large advantage in technology, numbers and firepower, yet still suffered huge losses, which he blamed on poor leadership.

Although their victory and the subsequent negotiation of the Soviet–Japanese Neutrality Pact secured the Far East for the duration of the Soviet-German War, the Red Army always remained cautious about the possibility of another, larger Japanese incursion as late as early 1944. In December 1943, when the American military mission proposed a logistics base be set up east of Lake Baikal, the Red Army authorities were according to Coox "shocked by the idea and literally turned white". Due to this caution, the Red Army kept a large force in the Far East even during the bleakest days of the war in Europe. For example, on July 1, 1942, Soviet forces in the Far East consisted of 1,446,012 troops, 11,759 artillery pieces, 2,589 tanks and self-propelled guns, and 3,178 combat aircraft. Despite this, the Soviet operations chief of the Far Eastern Front, General A. K. Kazakovtsev, was not confident in his army group's ability to stop an invasion if the Japanese committed to it (at least in 1941–1942), commenting: "If the Japanese enter the war on Hitler's side ... our cause is hopeless."

Japanese assessment and reforms
The Japanese similarly considered the result not a failing of tactics, but one that simply highlighted a need to address the material disparity between themselves and their neighbours. They made several reforms as a result of this battle: Tank production was increased from 500 annually to 1,200 in 1939. A mechanized headquarters was established in early 1941, and the new Type 1 47 mm anti-tank gun was introduced as a response to the Soviet 45 mm. These cannons were mounted on Type 97 Chi-Ha tanks, resulting in the Type 97 ShinHoTo Chi-Ha ("New Turret") variant, which became the IJA's standard medium tank by 1942. IGHQ also dispatched General Tomoyuki Yamashita to Germany in order to learn more about tank tactics, following the crushingly one-sided Battle of France and the signing of the Tripartite Pact. He returned with a report where he stressed the need for mechanization and more medium tanks. Accordingly, plans were put underway for the formation of 10 new armoured divisions in the near future.

Despite all of the above, Japanese industry was not productive enough to keep up with either the United States or the Soviet Union, and Yamashita warned against going to war with them for this reason. His recommendations were not taken to heart, and Japanese militarists eventually successfully pushed for war with the United States. In spite of their recent experience and military improvements, the Japanese would generally continue to underestimate their adversaries, emphasizing the courage and determination of the individual soldier as a way to make up for their lack of numbers and smaller industrial base. To varying degrees, the basic problems that faced them at Khalkhin Gol would haunt them again when the Americans and British recovered from their defeats of late 1941 and early 1942 and turned to the conquest of the Japanese Empire.

Also, events exposed a severe lack of procedures for emergency staunching of bleeding. The original Japanese doctrine explicitly forbade first aid to fellow soldiers without prior orders from an officer, and first-aid training was lacking. As result, a large proportion of Japanese dead was due to hemorrhaging from untreated wounds. Furthermore, up to 30% of the total casualties were due to dysentery, which the Japanese believed was delivered by Soviet biological-warfare aerial bombs. To reduce susceptibility to diseases, future Japanese divisions would commonly include specialized Epidemic Prevention and Water Purification Departments. Finally, the Japanese food rations were found to be unsatisfactory, both in packing and in nutritional value.

Legacy

After the Second World War, at the International Military Tribunal for the Far East, fourteen Japanese were charged by delegates of the conquering Soviet Union, with having "initiated a war of aggression ... against the Mongolian People's Republic in the area of the Khalkhin-Gol River" and also with having waged a war "in violation of international law" against the USSR. Kenji Doihara, Hiranuma Kiichirō and Seishirō Itagaki were convicted on these charges.

Commemoration 
The anniversary of the battle was first celebrated in 1969, on the occasion of its 30th anniversary. After its 50th anniversary, in 1989, it dwindled in importance, going down to the level of academic debates and lectures. Only recently has the anniversary made a resurgence as an important event in Mongolian history.

The Mongolian town of Choibalsan, in the Dornod Province where the battle was fought, is the location of the "G. K. Zhukov Museum", dedicated to Zhukov and the 1939 battle. Ulaanbaatar also has a "G. K. Zhukov Museum" with information about the battle. The latter museum was opened on 19 August 1979 in the presence of Yumjaagiin Tsedenbal and Zhukov's three daughters. During the 70th, 75th and 80th anniversaries of the battle in 2009, 2014 and 2019, respectively, the President of Russia has taken part in the celebrations alongside the President of Mongolia and Soviet and Mongolian veterans, with the celebration often coinciding with a state visit.

On the 80th anniversary, in 2019, a military parade was held in Choibalsan on Independence Square, which featured tactical formations of the Russian Armed Forces' Eastern Military District and the Mongolian Armed Forces, all of whom were participants in the joint Russian-Mongolian military exercises "Selenga-2019" the previous month. Parades were held in the federal subjects of Russia that surround and have a close relationship with Mongolia, such as Buryatia, Yakutia and the Altai Republic. In the Buryat capital of Ulan-Ude, a parade was held in the capital. In addition, a concert on Sükhbaatar Square took place on 28 August, during which the Russian Alexandrov Ensemble together with the Mongolian singers gave a performance.

See also
 Mukden Incident
 Tientsin incident
 Kantokuen
 Mongolia in World War II

Notes

References

Citations

Sources

 
 
 
 
 
 
 
 
  Combat Studies Institute (U.S. Army Command and General Staff). See also 
 
 
  online review.
 
 
 
 
 Moses, Larry W. "Soviet-Japanese Confrontation in Outer Mongolia: The Battle of Nomonhan-Khalkin Gol," Journal of Asian History (1967) 1#1 pp. 64–85.
 
  This work uses the Coox book and Drea paper as sources.
 Sella, Amnon. "Khalkhin-Gol: The Forgotten War," Journal of Contemporary History (1983) 18#4 pp. 651–87 in JSTOR
 Snow, Philip. "Nomonhan – the unknown victory," History Today (1990) 40#7 pp. 22–28
 
 Young, Katsu H. "The Nomonhan Incident: Imperial Japan and the Soviet Union," Monumenta Nipponica (1967) Vol. 22, No. 1/2 (1967), pp. 82–102 in JSTOR

External links

 Topographic Map of the Khalkhin Gol battle area
 Videos of the Nomonhan War Museum 
 Warbird Forum – Japan vs. Russia, 1939
 "On the Road to Khalkhin Gol", Part 1 and Part 2, by Henry Sakaida
 Парад в Монголии в честь 80-летия победы на Халхин-Голе

Battles involving Japan
Battles involving the Soviet Union
Battles involving Mongolia
Conflicts in 1939
Wars involving Mongolia
Military history of Manchuria
1939 in Japan
1939 in Mongolia
1939 in the Soviet Union
Japan–Mongolia relations
Japan–Soviet Union relations
Mongolia–Soviet Union relations
Pacific theatre of World War II
Battles involving Manchukuo
Tank battles involving Japan
Tank battles involving the Soviet Union
May 1939 events
June 1939 events
July 1939 events
August 1939 events
1939 in the Japanese colonial empire
Soviet–Japanese border conflicts